The UK Albums Chart is one of many music charts compiled by the Official Charts Company that calculates the best-selling albums of the week in the United Kingdom. Before 2004, the chart was only based on the sales of physical albums. This list shows albums that peaked in the Top 10 of the UK Albums Chart during 1966, as well as albums which peaked in 1965 but were in the top 10 in 1966. The entry date is when the album appeared in the top ten for the first time (week ending, as published by the Official Charts Company, which is six days after the chart is announced).

The first new number-one album of the year was by Aftermath by The Rolling Stones. Overall, two different albums peaked at number one in 1966, with two unique artists hitting that position.

Top-ten albums
Key

See also
1966 in British music
List of number-one albums from the 1960s (UK)

References
General

Specific

External links
1966 album chart archive at the Official Charts Company (click on relevant week)

United Kingdom top 10 albums
Top 10 albums
1966